is a train station located on the Eizan Electric Railway (Eiden) Kurama Line in Sakyō-ku, Kyoto, Kyoto Prefecture, Japan.

Layout
This station has two island platforms serving a track each.  There is an entrance on each platform.

Surroundings
Kyoto Municipal Rakuhoku Junior High School
Iwakura River
Doshisha Elementary School
Kokusaikaikan Station (Kyoto Municipal Subway Karasuma Line)

Adjacent stations

Railway stations in Kyoto Prefecture
Railway stations in Japan opened in 1928